Victorian Review: An Interdisciplinary Journal of Victorian Studies is a biannual peer-reviewed academic journal covering Victorian studies, which is published by the Victorian Studies Association of Western Canada. It was established in 1972 as the Newsletter of the Victorian Studies Association of Western Canada, before becoming a peer-reviewed journal in 1989. It publishes research articles, as well as book reviews. The editors-in-chief are Mary Elizabeth Leighton and Lisa Surridge (University of Victoria).

References

External links 
 

British history journals
Publications established in 1972
Biannual journals
Academic journals published by learned and professional societies of Canada
Multidisciplinary humanities journals